The Japan Volleyball Association (JVA) is the governing body for volleyball in Japan. It was founded in 1927, and has been a member of FIVB since 1951. It is also a member of the Asian Volleyball Confederation. The JVA is responsible for organizing the Japan men's national volleyball team and Japan women's national volleyball team.

History
 In 1921, Great Japan Volleyball Association was established and joined the Great Japan Sports Association.
 In 1946, Japan Volleyball Association was founded.
 In 1951, Japan Volleyball Association joint FIVB.
 In 1973, becomed an incorporated foundation.
 In 2011, becomed a public interest incorporated foundation.

Presidents

National teams
For details please refer to main articles for dedicated teams.

Men's
 Japan men's national under-19 volleyball team
 Japan men's national under-21 volleyball team
 Japan men's national volleyball team

Women's
 Japan women's national under-19 volleyball team
 Japan women's national under-21 volleyball team
 Japan women's national volleyball team

Competitions

Current title holders

Source: Vleague, JVA

Top Partner(s)

References

External links
  

Japan
Volleyball in Japan
Volleyball